Albert Thomas Church III (born 1947) is a retired vice admiral in the United States Navy. Church served as on active duty for 36 years, retiring as a vice admiral in 2005. During his service he commanded two warships, the Navy's largest shore installation at Naval Station Norfolk, Virginia, and was the longest-serving budget director of the Navy (1998–2002). Church also served as the Naval Inspector General, during which time he completed a comprehensive review of interrogation techniques used by the Department of Defense in Iraq, Afghanistan, and at Guantanamo Bay, Cuba. He is currently president of Prescient Edge Corporation, a US-based national security services and technology Firm.

Early life and education
Admiral Church was born in 1947, in Newport, Rhode Island. His father, Albert T. Church Jr. (U.S. Naval Academy Class of 1938) was a career naval officer, as were his uncle and both grandfathers. His grandfather, Albert T. Church I, was a roommate of Chester W. Nimitz of World War II fame, while at the U.S. Naval Academy. The Church family is originally from Idaho; Vice Admiral Church is a first cousin once removed of the late Senator Frank Church (D – Idaho), who was an outspoken critic of the Vietnam War and certain FBI and CIA intelligence-gathering and covert operations.

Highlights of navy career
Church entered the U.S. Naval Academy in 1965, graduating 4 years later with orders to his first ship, .  While serving on his second ship, USS O’Callahan (DE-1051) he was routinely on the “gun-line”, providing gunfire support to troops in Vietnam. During the course of his 36-year career he commanded two warships (a Minesweeper and Frigate) and the Navy's largest Naval Station, Naval Station Norfolk.  Selected for Rear Admiral in 1998, his assignments as a Flag Officer included the staff of the Commander, U.S Pacific Fleet, the Director of Financial Management and Budget (Budget Director) for the Navy and Marine Corps, the Naval Inspector General, and completing his career as the Director of the Navy Staff.  Church served 4 and ½ years as the Budget Director, the longest tenure in the position's history.  Church's office and his staff were in the newest section of the Pentagon that was destroyed during the September 11 attacks, but all escaped safely from their 4th floor offices before the wedge collapsed 20 minutes after airplane impact.

ISTF - The Church Report

Following the 2004 scandal at Abu Ghraib prison in Iraq, on May 25, 2004, under the direction of Secretary of Defense Donald Rumsfeld, Church assembled a team to conduct an inquiry into detainee interrogation and incarceration, in Iraq, Afghanistan, and Guantanamo Bay, Cuba.  He and a small team traveled to Cuba and collectively interviewed 800 Armed Service members, as well as senior Washington policy-makers, taking sworn statements and analyzing sensitive data that had been collected.

One of the early respondents to the data collection was Alberto J. Mora, then the General Counsel of the Department of the Navy, who provided insight into the discussions that led to the authorization of harsh interrogation techniques, which were subsequently discontinued in the Department of Defense. The data gathered and many of the early conclusions also supported the Independent Panel to Review the Department of Defense Detention Operations which was chaired by the Honorable James R. Schlesinger and reported to the Secretary of Defense in August 2004. The final Church Report was issued on March 2, 2005, followed by Congressional testimony and a press conference.  While much of the final report remains classified, the unclassified report  that accompanied the classified version summarizes the scope of the study and the overall findings.

Private sector work (2005–present)
From 2005 to 2011 Church was a principal at the government consulting and services provider Booz Allen Hamilton. In 2011, Church joined Prescient Edge Corporation; a national security services and technology contractor and currently serves as its president. The company provides solutions in the areas of defense, energy, infrastructure, intelligence, surveillance, and cyber security to U.S. Government agencies, foreign governments, and customers in select commercial markets.

Awards and medals
Church's personal awards and decorations include the Navy Distinguished Service Medal, Defense Superior Service Medal, Legion of Merit (three awards), Meritorious Service Medal (three awards), Navy and Marine Corps Commendation Medal, Navy and Marine Corps Achievement Medal (two awards) and the Combat Action Ribbon.

  Navy Distinguished Service Medal
  Defense Superior Service Medal
  Legion of Merit with two award stars
  Meritorious Service Medal with two award stars
  Navy and Marine Corps Commendation Medal
  Navy and Marine Corps Achievement Medal
  Combat Action Ribbon

Partial list of postings

See also

References

External links

Copy of the report
PDF Copy of the report
official USN biography of Albert T. Church
Statement of Rear Admiral Albert T. Church, Before the Readiness and Management Support Subcommittee of the Senate Armed Services Committee on The President's Budget Request for Readiness Programs, March 7, 2000
Prescient Edge Corporation website

1947 births
Living people
United States Navy vice admirals
Recipients of the Navy Distinguished Service Medal
Recipients of the Legion of Merit
United States Navy Inspectors General
Recipients of the Defense Superior Service Medal